Tawadros is an Arabic variant (تواضروس)  of the name Theodore, both originating from the Greek Θεόδωρος Theōdoros.

It may refer to:
 Pope Tawadros II of Alexandria (born 1952), leader of the Coptic Orthodox Church of Alexandria, Egypt
 Joseph Tawadros (born 1983), Egyptian-Australian oud virtuoso
Theodore Abu Qurrah, 9th-century Middle Eastern theologian
 23922 Tawadros, main belt asteroid

See also
 Tewodros (disambiguation)
 Theodore
 Theodore (name)
 Theodore (disambiguation)

Coptic given names